Alfred Jowett CBE was Dean of Manchester in the last third of the 20th Century. Born on 29 May 1914, educated at High Storrs and  St Catharine's College, Cambridge  and ordained in 1945, he began his career at St John the Evangelist, Goole. Afterwards he was  Secretary to the  Sheffield Anglican and Free Church Council and Marriage Guidance Council then Vicar of St George with St Stephen, in his home city. Between 1960 and 1964 he was Vicar of Doncaster when he was elevated to the Deanery, serving 19 years. An honorary graduate of the University of Sheffield, he died on 28 July  2004.

Notes

1914 births
People educated at High Storrs Grammar School for Boys
Alumni of St Catharine's College, Cambridge
Deans of Manchester
Commanders of the Order of the British Empire
2004 deaths
Alumni of Lincoln Theological College
Clergy from Sheffield